Run archery is a shooting discipline connecting archery with running. It is similar to the sport of biathlon.

History
Run archery was developed during the 1990s by European archery associations. Since 2000, some countries in other areas like Russia, Hungary, the Netherlands and Germany have begun organizing annual national championships. Run archery was officially admitted as a discipline of the World Archery Federation in 2003.

Rules
For scoring, it does not matter whether the target is hit in the center or at the edge. For each missed shot the athlete must run a penalty loop. The number of laps and target sizes depend on age and bow type. At the end, the fastest athlete wins.
The bow must be held in hand during running; arrows can be left at the shooting range or may be carried in a back quiver.

External links 
 List of tournaments and clubs

References 

Archery